Alfred Jefferies may refer to:

Alf Jeffries (footballer, born 1914), English professional footballer for Norwich City, Bradford City and Derby County
Alf Jefferies (footballer, born 1922), English professional footballer for Brentford and Torquay United
Alf Jefferies (darts player) from Denmark Open (darts)